Jean Majérus (19 February 1891 – 24 November 1961) was a Luxembourgian cyclist. He competed in two events at the 1920 Summer Olympics.

References

External links
 

1891 births
1961 deaths
Luxembourgian male cyclists
Olympic cyclists of Luxembourg
Cyclists at the 1920 Summer Olympics
People from Wiltz (canton)